The 2010 Mid-Eastern Athletic Conference men's basketball tournament took place on March 9–13, 2010 at the Lawrence Joel Veterans Memorial Coliseum in Winston-Salem, North Carolina. The championship game was nationally televised on ESPN2 on Saturday, March 13, 2010 at 2:00 p.m. The tournament champion, Morgan State, received an automatic berth to the 2010 NCAA Men's Division I Basketball Tournament.  

The Morgan State Bears, as the 2009-10 conference regular season champions, earned the No. 1 seed and an early round bye for the third straight season.

Bracket

Source: 2010 MEAC Men's Basketball Tournament Bracket at www.meacsports.com

References

MEAC men's basketball tournament
2009–10 Mid-Eastern Athletic Conference men's basketball season